Tanwaka is a town in the Boudry Department of Ganzourgou Province in central Burkina Faso. In 2005, the town was recorded to have a population of 1,116.

References

Populated places in the Plateau-Central Region
Ganzourgou Province